P.N.Patti is a panchayat town in Salem district in the Indian state of Tamil Nadu.

Demographics
 India census, P.N.Patti had a population of 23,268. Males constitute 52% of the population and females 48%. P.N.Patti has an average literacy rate of 63%, higher than the national average of 59.5%: male literacy is 72%, and female literacy is 54%. In P.N.Patti, 12% of the population is under 6 years of age.

References

Cities and towns in Salem district